Elephant Rock (Icelandic:Fíllinn) is a natural rock formation on the island of Heimaey, in the Westman Islands archipelago. It is made of basalt rock formed in a volcanic eruption of Eldfell. 

It is known for its shape which resembles the head of an elephant with its trunk in the water.

References

Geology of Iceland